Mohawk & Headphone Jack (alternately written as Mo Hawk & Headphone Jack) is a 1996 2D rotational game released for the Super Nintendo Entertainment System.

The game was developed by American studio Solid Software, published by THQ and distributed by Electro Source. The programming credit for the game is held by industry veteran D. Scott Williamson. The game spins around and around wildly in a circle, changing the rotation of the map also, and making it difficult to continue in the right direction. Rock music plays in the background as one or two players attempt to negotiate a treacherous series of platforms throughout the game's 14 levels. The game's likeness was based on Sonic the Hedgehog.

Gameplay
The aim of each level is to collect enough CDs in order to open the exit to the next level. The CD number in the bottom left-hand corner will sound an alert and begin flashing when the required number has been reached. The exit appears on the map as a flashing X (not to be confused with the player's current location) after the required number of CDs has been reached. There are different coloured CDs worth a different number of points, as well as large CDs that can be collected that unlock different audio tracks (the final one being Elephant Funk). Every second level ends with a boss, and will lead to a different world upon completion.

Mohawk's health is represented by yellow triangles and each time he is hit by an enemy, the number will go down (maximum of five). However, spikes bring instant death like in most classic video games. He can also collect floating balls (maximum of three) which allow him to explode, killing all enemies on screen. There are also a variety of forms Mohawk can become including wheelie, springs, angel and mer-hawk.

Reception

Captain Squideo of GamePro warned gamers that the game's rotating screen is enough to make one queasy, and summarized the game as "Different, yes; fun, no." A reviewer for Next Generation ridiculed the character design, saying that Mohawk looks like a naked man with no genitals. He praised the huge, complex levels and the well-designed map screen, but found the game too focused on navigation, being populated by only a few generic, easy-to-kill enemies. He concluded, "While some players may love the adventure aspect of finding new hidden areas, Mohawk could've been a more compelling title if there was more of a challenge in completing the task rather than just mulling through."

References

External links

1996 video games
Platform games
Side-scrolling video games
Super Nintendo Entertainment System games
Super Nintendo Entertainment System-only games
Multiplayer and single-player video games
THQ games
Video games developed in the United States
Black Pearl Software games